High Stakes Poker is a cash game poker television program broadcast originally by the cable television Game Show Network (GSN) in the United States and now broadcast on PokerGO. It premiered on January 16, 2006 and ended on December 17, 2007 for the first 4 seasons. Seasons 5 through 7 ran from March 1, 2009 to May 21, 2011. Season 8 debuted on December 16, 2020 and ended on March 17, 2021. The poker variant played on the show is no limit Texas hold 'em. The show was taped in a poker room setting at various casino hotel locations in Las Vegas, Nevada. The latest season is taped in the PokerGO studio inside Aria Resort and Casino.

The participants on the show include both professional poker players and amateur players, including celebrity amateurs who have had some success in major tournaments, such as Jerry Buss, Sam Simon, Nick Cassavetes, and others.

Players 

Note: Player list accurate heading into Season 10.

References 

Poker players
Lists of celebrities
Lists of games
American television-related lists